Chotta Mumbai is a 2007 Indian Malayalam-language action comedy film directed by Anwar Rasheed, written by Benny P. Nayarambalam, and co-produced by Maniyanpilla Raju. The film stars Mohanlal in the lead role with Siddique, Jagathy Sreekumar, Kalabhavan Mani, Indrajith Sukumaran, Manikuttan, Bijukuttan, Sai Kumar and Bhavana in supporting roles. Rahul Raj composed the score and songs of the film. The plot follows Vasco da Gama (Thala) and his gang of friends, all unemployed and leading a happy-go-lucky life until they encounter a corrupt police officer and gangster, Nadeshan.

The film released on 7 April 2007 opened to positive reviews and was a great success in box office.

Plot

The film starts in a street in Fort Kochi where Vasco da Gama, the son of a wrestler named Michael, lives. Vasco and his gang of five – "Mullan" Chandrappan, Susheelan, Sainu, "Padakkam" Basheer and cousin Tomichan are small-time goons, involved in petty offences and as the movie progresses, these characters turn out to be more endearing than bad.

Vasco goes by the nickname Thala (head) since he is the gang leader. Though Michael rebukes his son time and again for his lifestyle choices, he loves him and has big dreams for him. The plot progresses when a marriage broker contracts a wedding between Vasco and auto-rickshaw driver Latha, the only daughter of Pambu Chakochan who is a heavy drinker and a longtime friend of Michael.

Vasco likes Latha, but she pleads with him to tell her father that he does not like her, because she plans to elope with her boyfriend. Overjoyed at having discovered a fellow drinker in Vasco, Chakochan does not even let him voice his opinion. Vasco decides to help Latha out, but her plan to elope fails when she discovers that her boyfriend Suni is involved in human trafficking. She returns to Vasco.

Later when Vasco, Michael, Chandrappan and Latha travel in her auto-rickshaw, they clash with a gang that has been on the run after stabbing a honest police officer called Mohandas. Vasco and his father were witnesses to the murder which was committed by Satheesan, the younger brother of a corrupt circle inspector called Nadesan. This leads to complications.

Cast

Production
Jayasurya was cast in a role, but he had to opt out from the film due to scheduling conflicts with Kangaroo (2007 film).

Music

Composer Rahul Raj made his feature film debut through this film. The songs Thalaa and Vasco da Gama became chartbusters.

Release
The film was released on 7 April 2007 in 60 screens in Kerala, the biggest release for a Malayalam film.

Critical reception
The film was well received by critics. Unni R. Nair, in his review for Nowrunning.com said, "An out and out entertainer, it's a film that you would like to just sit back and enjoy, pushing all logical thinking to the background. Chotta Mumbai is a film that cashes in on Mohanlal's superstar image and its aim is merely to entertain and enthrall." Paresh C Palicha of Rediff.com gave the film a  rating and positively reviewed the film's script, Mohanlal's lead performance, Anwar Rasheed's direction as well as the performances of the supporting cast. Sify.com also published an extremely positive review and said: "What makes the film tick is Mohanlal's at the heart of this mad, mad, mad world with his impeccable sense of comic timing. Clearly, he is at home playing this type of character- for him, it is the equivalent of an old pair of Hawai slippers. If laughter is the best medicine then Anwar Rasheed has earned his stripes yet again."

Box office
The film was a blockbuster at the box office and became one of the top five highest-grossing Malayalam films of the year. It ran for over 101 days in theatres.

References

External links 
 

2007 films
2000s Malayalam-language films
Indian crime comedy films
Indian action comedy films
Indian black comedy films
Films scored by Rahul Raj
Films directed by Anwar Rasheed
2007 action comedy films
2007 black comedy films
2000s crime comedy films
Films shot in Kochi